Hendraburnick (meaning rushy home farm) is a farmstead near Davidstow, Cornwall, England. On Hendraburnick Down is the source of the River Camel.

In the medieval period, Hendraburnick was a manor held under Launceston Castle.
Feet of fines records that in 1383 some land in the settlement of Hendraburnick was held by a Roger Knyght, reverting on his death to a John Lordman of Treleigh.

A 17th century farmhouse there is a grade II listed building.

Hendraburnick Quoit to the north east is a Late Neolithic dolmen, regarded as "the most decorated or deliberately marked stone in southern Britain".

See also

 List of farms in Cornwall

Notes
a. Historical alternative spellings include Hendrebrunnek, Hendrabunyck, Hendraburnycke, Hendraburneck, Hendraburnocke, Henderburnic, Hendrabornicke, and Henderburnick

References

Farms in Cornwall